The 1964–65 St. Francis Terriers men's basketball team represented St. Francis College during the 1964–65 NCAA men's basketball season. The team was coached by Daniel Lynch, who was in his seventeenth year at the helm of the St. Francis Terriers. The team played as an independent and was not affiliated with a conference.

Prior to the beginning of the season the Terriers were highly rated. Yet, a concern from coach Lynch was their lack of a home court to practice on. Since 1960, the Terriers have played their home games at the 69th Regiment Armory and the team often practiced while soldiers were conducting drills.

The Terriers finished the season at 11–9, and had marquee victories over Seton Hall, Fordham, and CCNY.

Roster

  

   

    

source

Schedule and results

|-
!colspan=12 style="background:#0038A8; border: 2px solid #CE1126;;color:#FFFFFF;"| Regular Season

References

St. Francis Brooklyn Terriers men's basketball seasons
St. Francis
Saint Francis
Saint Francis